Bebić is a Croatian surname. Notable people with the surname include:

Ana Bebić (born 1986), Croatian singer
Luka Bebić (born 1937), Croatian politician
Milivoj Bebić (born 1959), Croatian water polo player
Toma Bebić (1935–1990), Croatian artist

Croatian surnames